Catamantaloedes (or Catamantaledes) was the ruler of the Sequani of eastern Gaul in the early to mid-1st century BC, and was recognised as a "friend" by the Roman Senate. His son, Casticus, was later part of Orgetorix's conspiracy ca. 60 BC.

References
 Julius Caesar, Commentarii de Bello Gallico 1.3

Gaulish rulers
Celts
1st-century BC rulers in Europe
Sequani